Graphium arycles, the spotted jay, is a species of butterfly of the family Papilionidae found in the Indomalayan realm. It is scarce and likely to be found in the extreme north east of India. It is not known to be threatened but the nominate subspecies is protected by law in India.

Subspecies
G. a. arycles Burma onward to Peninsular Malaya, Java, Sumatra, Bangka and Borneo
G. a. perinthus (Fruhstorfer, 1915) Philippines
G. a. sphinx (Fruhstorfer, 1899) Cambodia

See also
Papilionidae
List of butterflies of India
List of butterflies of India (Papilionidae)

References

 

arycles
Butterflies of Asia
Butterflies of Indochina
Butterflies described in 1836